Decio Azzolini, seniore (1 July 1549 – 7 October 1587) was a Roman Catholic cardinal.

Episcopal succession
While bishop, he was the principal consecrator of:

References

1549 births
1587 deaths
16th-century Italian cardinals
16th-century Italian Roman Catholic bishops
People from Fermo